Lake Walter E. Long (also known as Decker Lake) is a power plant cooling reservoir on Decker Creek in Austin, Texas.  The reservoir was officially impounded in 1967 and serves to provide water for turbines used in the production of electricity from petroleum-based fuels.  The dam and the lake are managed by the City of Austin.  Surrounding Lake Walter E. Long is the city of Austin's Lake Walter E. Long Metropolitan Park, a popular recreational destination.

Flora and fauna
Lake Walter E. Long has been stocked with species of fish intended to improve the utility of the reservoir for recreational fishing.  Fish present in Lake Walter E. Long include catfish, largemouth bass, hybrid striped bass, and sunfish.  Plant species present in the lake water include hydrilla, pondweed, bulrush, waterstar grass, American lotus, coontail, and southern naiad.

Recreational uses
Lake Walter E. Long Metropolitan Park is open for daytime recreational use.  Boating and fishing are the most popular recreational uses of the lake.

References

External links
City of Austin Map of lake and surrounding roads

Walter E. Long
Geography of Austin, Texas
1967 establishments in Texas
Protected areas of Travis County, Texas
Bodies of water of Travis County, Texas